Kälen is a small village near Piteå in northern Sweden.

References

Populated places in Västerbotten County